Frutigen is a railway station in the Swiss canton of Bern and municipality of Frutigen. The station is located on the Lötschberg line of the BLS AG, and is the junction point where the routes via the older Lötschberg tunnel and the more recent Lötschberg base tunnel diverge.

Services 
The following services stop at Frutigen:

The station is also served by PostAuto bus services to Wengi, Reudlen and Reichenbach im Kandertal, to Kandergrund, Blausee, Mitholz and Kandersteg, and to Achseten and Adelboden.

The northern portal of the Lötschberg base tunnel lies immediately to the south of the station. Trains passing through the station are able to use either Lötschberg route, thanks to a grade-separated junction between the station and tunnel mouth. This junction also allows trains on the base tunnel route to bypass Frutigen station, using the Engstlige tunnel.

Whilst passenger trains on the base tunnel route can serve Frutigen station, only one train per day does so, with most stopping services operating via the old line.

References

External links 

Railway stations in the canton of Bern
BLS railway stations